Beth A. Cunningham is an American physicist.

Cunningham earned her undergraduate and doctoral degrees from Kent State University, and subsequently completed postdoctoral training at the Hormel Institute. She began her teaching career at Gettysburg College. After a year in Gettysburg, Cunningham joined the Bucknell University faculty in 1989. At Bucknell, Cunningham became associate dean of the faculty in the College of Arts and Sciences in 2000, two years before attaining the rank of full professor. Cunningham was appointed provost, dean of the faculty, and physics professor at Illinois Wesleyan University in 2006. In 2011, she was named executive officer of the American Association of Physics Teachers. Cunningham was elected a fellow of the American Physical Society in 2021, for her contributions to physics education.

References

Living people
Year of birth missing (living people)
20th-century American physicists
21st-century American physicists
Kent State University alumni
Gettysburg College faculty
Bucknell University faculty
Illinois Wesleyan University faculty
Fellows of the American Physical Society
Women deans (academic)
American university and college faculty deans
Physics educators
American women physicists
20th-century American women scientists
21st-century American women scientists